Miguel Rodrigo (born 15 July 1970) is a Spanish Futsal coach. Miguel Rodrigo had successful spell between 2009 and 2016 with Japan which won two titles of AFC Futsal Championship under his guidance. Due to his depth of tactics and formations, he was dubbed by the Japanese media and fans as The Magician (Japanese : 魔法使 – Mahōtsukai).

Career

Japan
In June 2009, Japan Football Association (JFA) has appointed Miguel Rodrigo as the national Futsal trainer with one-year contract. In 2010, Rodrigo guided Japan to the semi-finals of 2010 AFC Futsal Championship. Japan lost to Iran in the semi but secured the third-place after the win over China in the third-place playoff match. He got the two-years contract extension from JFA after the tournament.

In 2012 AFC Futsal Championship at United Arab Emirates, Miguel Rodrigo led Japan to their second title of Asian Championship after the win 6–1 over Thailand in the final.

In 2012 FIFA Futsal World Cup at Thailand, Japan was in Group C along with Brazil, Portugal and Libya in the group stage. Rodrigo guided Japan to the next round by finishing third-place in the group with 4 points. Japan later lost 3–6 to Ukraine in Round of 16. His most notable moment in the tournament was in the group stage when Rodrigo led Japan to draw 5 – 5 against Portugal after being downed 2 – 5 in the first half. In February 2013, he got contract extension to 2016.

In 2014 AFC Futsal Championship at Vietnam, Rodrigo guided Japan to their third and two-in-a-row Asian championship title after won the penalty shoot-out over Iran after 2–2 draw in time.

In 2016 AFC Futsal Championship at Uzbekistan, Rodrigo failed to lead Japan to 2016 FIFA Futsal World Cup after the defeat by penalty shoot-out to Vietnam in the Quarterfinals and the loss to Kyrgyzstan in 5th – 8th place play-off match. Miguel Rodrigo has stepped down from his position after the tournament.

Thailand
On 1 July 2016, Football Association of Thailand announced the appointment of Miguel Rodrigo as the national trainer of Thailand with a-year-long-contract. His official managerial debut for Thailand was on 20 August 2016, the game of 2016 Thailand Five's against his former side Japan which ended as 2–2 draw. He managed to win 7–5 over Asian champion Iran and draw 3–3 against third-place from UEFA Futsal Euro 2016, Kazakhstan in other two matches of the tournament.

Miguel Rodrigo led Thailand to 2016 FIFA Futsal World Cup in Colombia. Thailand was placed in Group B along with Russia, Egypt and Cuba. Thailand played first match against the third place in World Ranking, Russia and lost by 4–6 with the impressive performance. Rodrigo lead Thailand to win other two games in the group stage against Cuba and Egypt and qualified for round of 16 as the runner-up of Group B behind Russia who fully collected 9 points. This is the first time in the history that Thailand could collect more than 3 points in the group stage. Rodrigo guided Thailand to the round of 16 and defeated to Azerbaijan with an 8–13 result in the extra-time after a 7–7 draw in 40 minutes.

In January 2017, Miguel Rodrigo lead Thailand to the 2016 AFF Futsal Championship, the premier competition of Southeast Asia. Thailand under his coaching managed to collect two wins in the group stage over Timor-Leste and Brunei then advanced to the semi-finals. In the semi-finals against Malaysia, his Thailand was stunted with the 0–3 losing result in the first half. However, Thailand turned it around and won it with the 5–3 result. In the final of the tournament, Thailand comfortably won 8–1 over Myanmar and lifted their twelfth AFF Futsal Championship title. It was also the first trophy of Miguel Rodrigo with Thailand.

Thailand Under 20
Starting from February 2017, Miguel Rodrigo also takes a charge on Thailand national under-20 futsal team to compete in 2017 AFC U-20 Futsal Championship.

In the group stage of 2017 AFC U-20 Futsal Championship, Thailand was placed as the seed team of Group A. Thai team won first 4 games against Malaysia, Bahrain, Brunei and Afghanistan then lost to Iraq in the last game of the stage. Thailand qualified for the first round of knock-out stage as the runner-up of group A.

At the knock-out round, Miguel Rodrigo lead Thailand to beat Indonesia with 4–2 winning result and advanced to face Iran in semi-finals. Thailand lost 5 – 7 to Iran in the extra-time after a 3–3 draw at the end of 40 minutes. Thailand missed the final and had to face Uzbekistan in the third-place playoff match.

In the third-place placement on 24 May, Thailand U-20 under Miguel Rodrigo won 8–-1 over Uzbekistan under the training of former Thailand's head coach, Pulpis. Thailand claimed the third place in the first edition of 2017 AFC U-20 Futsal Championship.

Parting way with Thailand
After one year with Thailand, Miguel Rodrigo's contract was running out at the end of 2017 July.

On 30 May at the headquarter of Football Association of Thailand, Miguel Rodrigo officially announced that he will not prolong the contract with Football Association of Thailand to open for the offers. He stated the farewell message to the fans and cheered next Thailand's trainer and his Spaniard fellow, Pulpis.

Managerial statistics 

 Only official games against other national team.
 A win or loss by the penalty shoot-out is regarded as the draw in time.

Achievements

Manager
 Japan
AFC Futsal Championship:  Champion (2) : 2012, 2014.

 Thailand
AFF Futsal Championship:   Champion (1) : 2016.

 Thailand U-20
AFC U-20 Futsal Championship: Third-place (1) : 2017.

 Thái Sơn Nam
 AFC Futsal Club Championship: Runner-up: 2018
AFF Futsal Championship 2019: Runner-up

Certification
 FIFA Futsal instructor.
 RFEF Level 3 Futsal coaching certificate.

References

External links
Miguel Rodrigo at futsalplanet

1970 births
Living people
People from Valencia
Spanish men's futsal players
Spanish futsal coaches
Thailand national futsal team managers